Friedrich Christian Baumeister (17 July 1709 – 8 October 1785) was a German philosopher.

Baumeister studied philosophy in Jena and Wittenberg. He became director of the Görlitz gymnasium in 1736. His textbooks propagated the metaphysics of Christian Wolff.

Works
 Philosophia definitiva, 1735. 1767 edition available online
 Institutiones philosophiae rationalis : methodo Wolfii conscriptae, 1735
 Institutiones metaphysicae : ontologiam, cosmologiam, psychologiam, theologiam denique naturalem complexae, 1738 and 1751
 Historia doctrinae de mundo optimo, 1741
 Elementa philosophiae recentioris : usibus iuventutis scholasticae accommodata, 1747

References

External links

1709 births
1785 deaths
18th-century German philosophers
German male writers